Jingzhou (532) is a Type 054A frigate of the People's Liberation Army Navy. She was commissioned on 5 January 2016.

Development and design 

The Type 054A carries HQ-16 medium-range air defence missiles and anti-submarine missiles in a vertical launching system (VLS) system. The HQ-16 has a range of up to 50 km, with superior range and engagement angles to the Type 054's HQ-7. The Type 054A's VLS uses a hot launch method; a shared common exhaust system is sited between the two rows of rectangular launching tubes.

The four AK-630 close-in weapon systems (CIWS) of the Type 054 were replaced with two Type 730 CIWS on the Type 054A. The autonomous Type 730 provides improved reaction time against close-in threats.

Construction and career 
Jingzhou was launched on 22 January 2015 at the Hudong–Zhonghua Shipbuilding in Shanghai. Commissioned on 5 January 2016.

On 28 April 2017, Chaohu, Changchun and Jingzhou arrived in Davao City, Mindanao for a visit. On 25 May, the ships conducted an exercise with the Myanmar Navy, which was China's first time to hold an exercise with Myanmar. On 12 June, they arrived in Karachi. On 23 July, same ships were sent for a visit to Piraeus Port.

Gallery

References 

2015 ships
Ships built in China
Type 054 frigates